The 1977–78 Winnipeg Jets season was the Jets' sixth season of operation in the World Hockey Association (WHA). The Jets, finalists in 1977, qualified first for the playoffs and the championship against the New England Whalers in the Final. It was the Jets' second Avco Cup win.

Offseason

Regular season

Final standings

Schedule and results

Playoffs
Due to their victory over the Bulls, they earned a bye to the Finals while the other two Semifinal winners faced off against each other.

Winnipeg Jets 4, Birmingham Bulls 1

Winnipeg Jets 4, New England Whalers 0 – Avco Cup Finals

Player statistics

Regular season
Scoring

Goaltending

Playoffs
Scoring

Goaltending

Awards and records

Transactions

Draft picks
Winnipeg's draft picks at the 1977 WHA Amateur Draft.

Farm teams

See also
1977–78 WHA season

References

External links

Winnipeg Jets (1972–1996) seasons
Winn
Winn